The FIA European Rally Trophy, ERT is a European rally competition. The ERT is made up of competitors from seven regions, which are the Alpine Rally Trophy, the Balkan Rally Trophy, the Baltic Rally Trophy, the Benelux Rally Trophy, the Celtic Rally Trophy, the Central Rally Trophy and the Iberian Rally Trophy.  The top five competitors in each class from the seven regions are eligible to enter the European Rally Trophy final.

History
The ERT evolved from European Rally Cup, which ran in 2012-2013. In 2012 European Rally Cup ran in 3 regions: South, East and Central. For the 2013 edition European Rally Cup ran as a single tournament made up of 17 rounds.

2014

The first competition of ERT was won by the Bulgarian Krum Donchev, he had won both his home events and defeated Oleksandr Saliuk, Jr. who was only present at three events. The competition format was single championship made up of 13 rounds.

2015

The Turkish ex-JWRC driver scored five wins in five starts to become 2015 champion, driving both R5 and S2000. His rival and runner up was the Emirati Rashid Al-Ketbi, remained winless but had three podium finishes. Third was Slovenian driver Rok Turk who won twice in 2015. The competition format was single championship made up of 14 rounds.

2016
The competition format gained a new shape from 2016 onwards. The tournament consisted of 3 regional ERT championships - Balkan, Baltic, Celtic, Central and Iberian. The top 5 each championship drivers qualified to the final race, which in 2016 was selected to be International Rally Waldviertel (:de:Rallye Waldviertel).

2017
The new format proved to be successful, with two more regional ERT championships added - Alpine and Benelux. The final race took place in Rallye Casinos do Algarve.

2018
The last year's format was repeated, including the final race in Rallye Casinos do Algarve.

2019
Same seven regional ERT championships took place, with the final taking place at Rallye International du Valais on 16-19 October.

2020
Seven regional ERT championships were scheduled to take place, with the Alpine Rally Trophy renamed as the Alps Rally Trophy. However the COVID-19 pandemic caused most rounds to be cancelled. The ERT Final took place at the International ADMV Lausitz Rallye (:de:Boxberg/O.L.#Lausitz-Rallye).

2021
A Scandinavian Rally Trophy was scheduled to be added, but the three rounds were cancelled. The ERT Final was held at the Internationale ADMV Lausitz Rallye.

2022
The Baltic and Benelux trophies were dropped, therefore the six regional trophies were Alps, Balkan, Celtic, Central, Iberian and Scandinavian. The ERT Final was held at the Internationale ADMV Lausitz Rallye.

Past winners

See also
List of FIA events
European Rally Championship

References

Rally racing series
Fédération Internationale de l'Automobile
2014 establishments in Europe
Recurring sporting events established in 2014